Stepnoy is a rural locality (a settlement) and the administrative center of Stepnovskoye Rural Settlement, Leninsky District, Volgograd Oblast, Russia. The population was 749 as of 2010. There are 18 streets.

Geography 
The village is located on Caspian Depression, 100 km from Volgograd, 45 km from Leninsk.

References 

Rural localities in Leninsky District, Volgograd Oblast